The  is a railway line operated by the Nankai Electric Railway, which connects Izumisano and Kansai International Airport and is owned by Kansai International Airport Co., Ltd. between Rinkū Town and Kansai Airport. It opened on June 15, 1994.

It is one of the access routes to the Kansai International Airport which is located on an artificial island in Ōsaka Bay. The line colour of the Airport Line is purple.

Rolling stock
Nankai 7000 series (until October 2015)
Nankai 7100 series
Nankai 9000 series
Nankai 2000 series
Nankai 1000 series
Nankai 8000 series
Nankai 8300 series (from Autumn 2015)
Nankai 50000 series, used on rapi:t services
JR West trains also use the track between Rinkū Town and Kansai Airport.

Stations
Limited express (rapi:t), Airport express, Local: All trains stop at every station.
For stations within the Nankai Main Line, refer to the "Nankai Main Line" article.

References
This article incorporates material from the corresponding article in the Japanese Wikipedia

Airport Line
Airport rail links in Japan
1067 mm gauge railways in Japan
Railway lines opened in 1994
1994 establishments in Japan
Rail transport in Osaka Prefecture